Klukowo  is a village in the administrative district of Gmina Siemiatycze, within Siemiatycze County, Podlaskie Voivodeship, in north-eastern Poland.

References

2. https://www.city-facts.com/klukowo-siemiatycze-county

Klukowo